Norlington School is a boys' secondary school and coeducational sixth form located in the London Borough of Waltham Forest, in East London. The school is situated on Norlington Road in Leyton.

History
Norlington Road Council School was initially an elementary school for boys, girls, and infants, which opened in 1903. In 1932 it was reorganized for senior girls, junior girls, and infants. In 1940 the school was badly damaged by German bombs during the Blitz.

The junior department became mixed in 1942. In 1948 the school became a secondary modern school for boys. An extension was completed in 1964 to provide science labs and woodwork and metalwork rooms. In 1968, Waltham Forest adopted the Comprehensive system and it became Norlington Junior High School for Boys, catering for 11- to 14-year-olds.

Following a Borough-wide reorganisation in the early 1980s, it adopted its current name and function.

In September 2015, the school opened a mixed-sex sixth form, offering 10 A-level subjects including science, technology and mathematics.

Previously a community school administered by Waltham Forest London Borough Council, in September 2016 Norlington School converted to academy status. The school is now sponsored by The Exceptional Education Trust.

Notable former pupils
 Jonathan Ross, television presenter
 Paul Ross, television presenter 
 Graham Gooch, former England cricketer
 Paul Hayes, professional footballer
 Paul Davis (programmer), founding programmer at Amazon.com
 Vic Groves Arsenal Footballer 1950s
 Keith Darvill Member of Parliament for Upminster, 1997-2001
 Edgar Pearce, extortionist and bomber

References

External links

OFSTED report

Boys' schools in London
Secondary schools in the London Borough of Waltham Forest
Academies in the London Borough of Waltham Forest
Leyton